"Burn Burn" is the first single from Start Something, the second album from the Welsh rock band Lostprophets. The video for the single was filmed in The Roundhouse, Camden, London.

Release and reception
"Burn Burn" was released in the winter of 2003 and became one of the most successful songs from Start Something on the rock charts. "Burn Burn" charted at 81 on the German Single Chart and on 48 on the Australian Singles Chart. "Last Train Home" is their second single to ever chart in the US — the first one is "Shinobi vs. Dragon Ninja." "Burn Burn" is their only single to ever chart in Germany.

Dan Martin of NME said "It’s still metal, but wonder at how the single 'Burn Burn' gleams more with the spirit of glam than downtuned riff rock." Kirk Miller of Rolling Stone said "Standouts such as 'Last Train Home' and 'Burn Burn' hint at something awesome. In the meantime, it's a kick-ass tribute."

Track listing

Personnel
 Ian Watkins – lead vocals
 Lee Gaze – lead guitar
 Mike Lewis – rhythm guitar
 Stuart Richardson – bass guitar
 Mike Chiplin – drums, percussion
 Jamie Oliver – synth, turntables, samples, vocals

In popular culture 
"Burn Burn" was featured in the soundtrack of sports video game FIFA Football 2004.

Chart positions

References 

Lostprophets songs
2003 singles
2003 songs
Song recordings produced by Eric Valentine
Columbia Records singles